Giuseppe Bottai (3 September 1895 – 9 January 1959) was an Italian journalist, and member of the National Fascist Party of Benito Mussolini.

Early life
Born in Rome, Giuseppe was son of Luigi, a wine dealer with republican sympathies, and Elena Cortesia. He graduated at Liceo Torquato Tasso and attended the Sapienza University of Rome until the 1915, when Italy declared war to the Central Powers. The same year, he left his studies to enlist himself in the Italian Royal Army. Wounded in battle, he obtained a Medal of Military Valor after World War I.

In 1919, Bottai met Benito Mussolini during a Futurist meeting and contributed to establish the Fasci Italiani di Combattimento ("Italian Fasces of Combat").
In 1921, Bottai ended his studies at law faculty and became a freemason, member of the Gran Loggia d'Italia. At the same time he also started a journalist career in the Il Popolo d'Italia, the newspaper of the recently founded National Fascist Party.
During the March on Rome, Bottai was along with Ulisse Igliori and Gino Calza-Bini, the head of the Roman squadrismo, supporting the Blackshirts' political violence.

Political career

After 1921 election, Bottai was elected in the Chamber of Deputies for the National Blocs but was removed for his young age. He returned to the Chamber in 1924 and stayed until 1943. In 1923, he became leader of the intransigent national-syndicalist and revolutionary faction of fascism. To support his ideas, Bottai founded Critica fascista ("Fascist Critic"), a cultural periodical, co-operating with other left-leaning fascists like Filippo De Pisis, Renato Guttuso and Mario Mafai. From 1030 he contributed to the political and finance magazine Lo Stato. 

Bottai worked to the Ministry of Corporations, introducing the Labour Charter and planning a "Corporative Academic Pole" in Pisa, from 1926 to 1932, when he was excluded by Mussolini from the Ministry. In 1933, Bottai established and chaired the National Institute of the Social Security (INPS). He was appointed governor of Rome (1935–1936), but resigned to fight in the Second Italo-Ethiopian War with the rank of major. On 5 May 1936, Bottai and Pietro Badoglio entered in Addis Abeba, and Bottai was appointed as vice governor. After the war, Bottai returned in Rome to be Education Minister. During his ministry, Bottai proclaimed a law (the so-called "Bottai Law") on safeguarding public and cultural heritage and the preservation of natural beauties. He also co-worked with art critics Giulio Carlo Argan and Cesare Brandi to improve the Italian cultural life.

In the late 1930s, Bottai became more radical and a germanophile. In 1938 he expressed support to racial laws against Italian Jews, and in 1940, he founded Primato ("Primacy") in 1941, a magazine that supported the Aryan race's supremacy and interventionism in the war. Bottai thought that the "Fascist Revolution" was incomplete and that what was needed was a return to the original, "pure" fascism.

World War II
However, the Italian intervention in World War II resulted in disaster. The Campaign on the Eastern Front caused the death or the injury of approximately 77,000 soldiers, with more than 39,000 injured. Bottai voted for Mussolini's arrest, which had been proposed by Dino Grandi, on 25 July 1943 after Italy's defeat had become evident. In 1944, the Italian Social Republic condemned Bottai to death, during the Verona trial, but Bottai hid in a Roman convent.

In 1944, Bottai enlisted in the French Foreign Legion with the pseudonym Andrea Battaglia. He fought in Provence during Operation Dragoon and then in the Western Allied invasion of Germany.

Later life
After the war, Bottai remained in France and continued to serve in the Foreign Legion until 1948, when he was discharged. For his role in the final stages of World War II, he got an amnesty for his role in fascism.

Returning in Italy in 1953, Bottai founded the periodical ABC (not to be confused with the magazine with the same name) and Il Popolo di Roma, which was financed by ex-fascist Vittorio Cini, who supported centrist and conservative views.

Bottai died in Rome in 1959. At his funeral was Aldo Moro who, like Moro's father, had been Bottai's friend and assistant during his career.

Bibliography
Trade organisation in Italy under the act and regulations on collective relations in connection with employment
Economia fascista (1930)
Grundprinzipien des korporativen Aufbaus in Italien (1933)
Esperienza corporativa (1929–1935) (1935)
Corporazioni (1935)
Scritti giuridici in onore di Santi Romano ... (1940)
Funzione di Roma nella vita culturale e scientifica della nazione (1940)
Pagine di critica fascista (1915–1926) (1941, edited by F. M. Pacces)
Romanità e germanesimo: letture tenute per il Lyceum di Firenze (1941, edited by Jolanda de Blasi)
Von der römischen zur faschistischen Korporation (1942)
Köpfe des risorgimento (1943)
Contributi all'elaborazione delle scienze corporative (1939-XVIII—1942-XX) (1943)
Vent 'anni e un giorno, 24 luglio 1943 (1949). Republished as Vent'anni e un giorno (24 luglio 1943) (1977).
Legione è il mio nome (1950). Republished as Legione è il mio nome: il coraggioso epilogo di un gerarca del fascismo (I memoriali) (1999, edited by Marcello Staglieno)
Scritti (1965, edited by Roberto Bartolozzi and Riccardo Del Giudice)
Diario, 1935–1944 (1982, edited by Giordano Bruno Guerri)
Carteggio 1940–1957, correspondence between Bottai and Don Giuseppe De Luca; edited by Renzo De Felice and Renato Moro (1989)
La politica delle arti: Scritti, 1918–1943 (1992, edited by Alessandro Masi).
Quaderni giovanili: 1915–1920 (Atti testimonianze convegni) (1996).

Notes

References

Incontro con Bottai by Mario Carli and Bruno D'Agostini (1938)
Giuseppe Bottai, un fascista critico : ideologia e azione del gerarca che avrebbe voluto portare l'intelligenza nel fascismo e il fascismo alla liberalizzazione by Giordano Bruno Guerri (1976 – Republished as Giuseppe Bottai, fascista, 1996).
Bottai : il fascismo come rivoluzione del capitale (1978, edited by Anna Panicali)
Scuola e la pedagogia del fascismo by Maria Bellucci and Michele Ciliberto (1978).
Giuseppe Bottai e la riforma fascista della scuola by Rino Gentili. (1979)
Bottai tra capitale e lavoro by Amleto Di Marcantonio (1980)
Biographical Dictionary of the Extreme Right Since 1890 by Philip Rees (1990)

External links
 

1895 births
1959 deaths
Writers from Rome
Members of the Grand Council of Fascism
Education ministers of Italy
Mussolini Cabinet
Deputies of Legislature XXVI of the Kingdom of Italy
Deputies of Legislature XXVII of the Kingdom of Italy
Deputies of Legislature XXVIII of the Kingdom of Italy
Deputies of Legislature XXIX of the Kingdom of Italy
Members of the Chamber of Fasces and Corporations
Mayors of Rome
People of former Italian colonies
Italian economists
Italian male journalists
Italian Freemasons
National syndicalists
Antisemitism in Italy
Members of the Lincean Academy
Italian military personnel of World War I
French military personnel of World War II
Soldiers of the French Foreign Legion
Exiled Italian politicians
20th-century Italian journalists
Italian magazine founders